The athletics competition in the 1959 Central American and Caribbean Games were held in Caracas, Venezuela.

Medal summary

Men's events

Women's events

Medal table

References

 
 
 

Athletics at the Central American and Caribbean Games
C
1959 Central American and Caribbean Games